Protomonostroma is a genus of green algae in the family Ulotrichaceae.

References

External links

Ulotrichaceae
Ulvophyceae genera